Deurne may refer to:

 Deurne, Belgium, a district of the city of Antwerp, Belgium
 Antwerp International Airport, located in the Antwerp district of Deurne, Belgium and colloquially named after it
 Deurne, Netherlands, a municipality in North Brabant, Netherlands
 SV Deurne, a football club based in Deurne, North Brabant